Azam Khan may refer to:

Government and politics
 Azam Khan (Tughlaq dynasty), governor of Bengal 1324–1328
 Mir Muhammad Baqir, Subahdar (governor) of Bengal Subah 1632–1635
 Azam Khan Koka, Subahdar of Bengal Subah 1676–1677
 Mohammad Azam Khan, Emir of Afghanistan 1867–1868
 Amir Azam Khan (1912–1976), Pakistani politician and entrepreneur
 Mir Mohammad Azam Jan Khan, the Khan of Kalat from 1931 to 1933
 Azam Khan Hoti (1946–2015), Pakistani politician
 Azam Khan (politician) (born 1948), Indian politician
 Azam Khan Swati (born 1956), Pakistani politician and businessman
 Muhammad Azam Khan (politician) (active from 2018), Pakistani member of the Provincial Assembly of Khyber Pakhtunkhwa
 Azam Khan (civil servant), Pakistani civil servant

Sports
 Azam Khan (cricketer, born 1969), Pakistani cricketer
 Azam Khan (cricketer, born 1998), Pakistani cricketer
 Azam Khan (squash player), Pakistani squash player

Other
 Azam and Muazzam Khan, 15th-century Persian architect brothers of the Gujarat sultanate, tomb in Ahmedabad, India
 Azam Khan (general) (1908–1994), senior general of the Pakistan army
 Azam Khan (singer) (1950–2011), Bangladeshi pop singer